Han Fu may refer to:

 Hanfu, historical Han Chinese clothing styles of China
 Hanfu movement, a social movement seeking to revitalize traditional Chinese fashion
 Han Fu (warlord), a politician and warlord during the late Eastern Han Dynasty
 Han Fu (fictional), a fictional character in the historical novel Romance of the Three Kingdoms
 Fu (poetry), a form of literature commonly associated with Han dynasty

See also